"I Walk Away" is a song written by Neil Finn, and originally recorded by Finn's group Split Enz. It was released in September 1984 as the lead single from their tenth and final studio album See Ya 'Round, and was a chart hit in New Zealand and Australia.

Finn's next group, Crowded House, re-recorded the song for the North American version of their self-titled debut album of 1986.  (See Ya 'Round was not issued in the U.S., and therefore the song "I Walk Away" was new to U.S. audiences.)  "I Walk Away" was not included on the original Australian/NZ release of Crowded House, but all later re-issues of the album in all countries include "I Walk Away" as a standard track.  The Crowded House version of the song is slightly rewritten from the original Split Enz version, and features a different verse. 

Finn sings both the Split Enz and Crowded House versions of "I Walk Away", and Paul Hester (who was a member of both groups) was the drummer on both.

Reception
Reviewing the Crowded House version, Junkee said, "There's something zeitgeisty about this one — it feels like U2 at their hungriest, propulsive and urgent in its delivery. Hester puts on a showcase of tension and release, while Seymour holds down the low-end and Finn executes some truly underrated guitar work."

Track listing

12" vinyl
Side A
"I Walk Away (Extended Version)"
Side B
"Doctor Love"

7" vinyl
"I Walk Away" 3:49
"Over Drive" 3:43

Personnel
 Neil Finn - vocals, guitar
 Eddie Rayner - keyboards, synthesizer, backing vocals
 Noel Crombie - percussion
 Nigel Griggs - bass
 Paul Hester - drums

Charts

References

Songs about parting
Split Enz songs
1984 singles
Songs written by Neil Finn
1984 songs
Mushroom Records singles